The 1963 NCAA College Division football rankings are from the United Press International poll of College Division head coaches and from the Associated Press.  The 1963 NCAA College Division football season was the sixth year UPI published a Coaches Poll in what was termed the "Small College" division. It was the fourth year for the AP version of the poll, which only listed 10 teams.

Legend

The AP poll

The UPI Coaches poll

References

Rankings
NCAA College Division football rankings